Back in 20 is a rock album released by Gary U.S. Bonds in 2004 on the M.C. Records label. The album features guest appearances by Bruce Springsteen, Southside Johnny, Dickey Betts, and Phoebe Snow. The title of the album is a reference to Bonds' sporadic croppings of popularity; first in the early 1960s, then the early 1980s, and now, again 20 some years later, in the early 2000s.

Track listing 

 "Can't Teach an Old Dog New Tricks" (Laurie Anderson, Gary U.S. Bonds) - 4:24
 "Murder in the First Degree" (Bonds, Mark Leimbach) - 3:13
 "Take Me Back" (Leimbach) - 3:25
 "She Just Wants to Dance" (Georgina Graper, Kevin Moore) - 3:09
 "Fanny Mae" (Waymon Glasco, Morris Levy, Clarence L. Lewis) - 3:39
 "Bitch/Dumb Ass" (Anderson, Bonds) - 4:05
 "I've Got Dreams to Remember" (Otis Redding, Zelma Redding, Joe Rock) - 4:36
 "Nothing But Blue" (Anderson, Bonds) - 4:17
 "She Chose to Be My Lady" (Bonds) - 3:30
 "Too Much, Too Little, Too Late" (Anderson, Bonds, Leimbach) - 3:47
 "Every Time I Roll the Dice" (Max Barnes, Troy Seals) - 4:29
 "Don't You Do It Here" (Anderson, Bonds, Leimbach) - 3:39

Personnel 

Musicians:
 Gary U.S. Bonds - lead vocals
 Bruce Springsteen - guitar ("Can't Teach an Old Dog New Tricks), background vocals ("Can't Teach an Old Dog New Tricks)
 Southside Johnny - harmonica ("Can't Teach an Old Dog New Tricks", "Take Me Back"), vocals ("Fannie Mae")
 Dickey Betts - guitar ("She Just Wants to Dance", "Bitch/Dumb Ass")
 Phoebe Snow - vocals ("Bitch/Dumb Ass")
 Joey Stann - saxophone
 Mark Leimbach - guitar
 Dan Cipriano - saxophone
 Jeff Kazee - keyboards
 Hal Selzer - bass
 Lance Hyland Stark - drums
 Jim Wacker - piano, keyboards
 Walter Smith - background vocals

Production:
 Gary U.S. Bonds - producer, engineer, horn arrangements
 Laurie Anderson - producer, engineer, photography
 Bruce Springsteen - engineer
 John Paul Cavanaugh - photography
 Dan Cipriano - horn arrangements
 Chris Musgrave - engineer
 Glen Robinson - engineer
 Toby Scott - engineer
 Phoebe Snow - engineer
 Joey Stann - horn arrangements

References 

2004 albums
Gary U.S. Bonds albums